Perina nuda, the clearwing tussock moth or banyan tussock moth, is a moth of the family Erebidae. The species was first described by Johan Christian Fabricius in 1787. It is found in the Indian subregion, Sri Lanka, to southern China Hong Kong, Thailand and Sundaland.

Description
Adults show striking sexual dimorphism. The caterpillar has a greyish head and flanks, with the broad black dorsum. Setae are white. Pupa is bristly, piebald in dark grey and cream. Setae in pupa orange. The caterpillar is a minor pest on several banyan species such as Ficus benjamina, Ficus benghalensis, Ficus racemosa, Ficus pumila and Ficus religiosa. and also many crop plants like Artocarpus and Mangifera.

The species is associated with an RNA virus called Perina nuda virus.

Images

References

External links
Semiochemicals of Perina nuda, the Clearwing tussock moth. The Pherobase.

Research articles
The complete genome sequence of Perina nuda picorna-like virus, an insect-infecting RNA virus with a genome organization similar to that of the mammalian picornaviruses.
Perina nuda virus
Life history of the Perina nuda (Fabricius) and virus production of the infected pupae
Continuous Cell line from Pupal Ovary of Perina nuda (Lepidoptera: Lymantriidae) That Is Permissive to Nuclear Polyhedrosis Virus from P. nuda
A Perina nuda cell line (NTU-Pn-HF) from pupal ovary that is persistently infected with a picorna-like virus (PnPV)
Characterization of a multiple-nucleocapsid nucleopolyhedrovirus isolated from Perina nuda (Fabricius) (Lepidoptera: Lymantriidae) larvae
The 5′ untranslated region of Perina nuda virus (PnV) possesses a strong internal translation activity in baculovirus-infected insect cells

Moths of Asia
Moths described in 1865